"There's Too Many Irons in the Fire" is the second single by the English rock band Cardiacs, released on 12 August 1987.

Critical reception

In the week of its release, There's Too Many Irons in the Fire was awarded "Single of the Week" in Sounds magazine. Reviewer Andy Hurt noted the band's apparent desire to rework 1970s influences for the 1980s, and commented that they were "well qualified for the task, being formed just after the eruption of punk, and representing the marriage between Van Der Graaf Generator and the Albertos." He went on to praise the band, asserting that "Cardiacs can write, Cardiacs can play, and by God Cardiacs can perform. The public are way ahead of the press in recognising this... Clever rock music that is not patronising and which has a sturdy backbone. Pretty damn fantastic actually."

Availability and reissuing

There's Too Many Irons in the Fire has been deleted. All of the tracks on the single were later re-issued as part of the Songs for Ships and Irons compilation (originally released in 1991 and reissued on CD in 1995).

Track listing
 "There's Too Many Irons in the Fire"
 "All Spectacular"
 "Loosefish Scapegrace"

Lineup
 Tim Smith – guitar, vocals
 Jim Smith – bass
 Sarah Smith – saxophone
 William D. Drake – keyboards
 Dominic Luckman – Drums
 Tim Quy – Percussion

References

1987 songs
1987 singles
Cardiacs songs
Songs written by Tim Smith (Cardiacs)